This list of Massachusetts Institute of Technology faculty includes current, emeritus, former, and deceased professors, lecturers, and researchers at the Massachusetts Institute of Technology. Faculty members who have become Institute Professors, Nobel Laureates, MacArthur Fellows, National Medal of Science recipients, or have earned other significant awards and made significant contributions are listed below.

Institute Professors

A few distinguished members of the faculty have held the title of Institute Professor in recognition of their extraordinary records of achievement and dedication to the MIT community.

Nobel Laureates

Current faculty

Emeritus faculty

Deceased faculty

Samuel Goudsmit (1902–1978), Dutch-American physicist

Former faculty

Former and/or retired research staff

MacArthur Fellows

Current faculty

Research staff

Former faculty

National Medal of Science

Current faculty

Emeritus faculty

Deceased faculty

Former faculty

Former and/or retired research staff

Other prominent faculty and researchers

References

Lists of people by university or college in Massachusetts